Act Two is the second studio album by English boy band Collabro. It was released on 1 June 2015 and debuted at number two on the UK Albums Chart. It sold 22,031 copies in the UK in its first week on sale. It has sold 75,142 copies as of March 2017.

Background
Collabro have claimed in interviews that the track listing was created through fan requests.

Critical reception
Yahoo gave a highly positive review.

Track listing
All tracks produced by James Morgan and Juliette Pochin. Additional production on "All I Want" and "I Won't Give Up" by Ash Howes.

Charts and certifications

Charts

Certifications

References

2015 albums
Collabro albums
Covers albums
Classical crossover albums
Syco Music albums